Ernst Sören Nordin (5 September 1917, in Forsa, Hälsingland – 6 September 2008) was a Swedish harness racing driver and trainer who later started a stable in America. Nordin won 3,221 races in 10 different countries as a driver, he won the Swedish Trotting Derby 11 times – still a record. In 1950, Nordin won the Prix d'Amérique, and in 1953 the Elitloppet. 21 times, Nordin was the champion driver at Solvalla racetrack in Stockholm, Sweden's premier track.

In 1981, he moved to the United States to set up the Team Nordin stable together with his son, Jan, training their trotters during the winter at Pompano Park's training center. They campaigned several top trotters and world champions including Baltic Speed, Brandy Hanover, Mr Drew, Sandy Bowl, Tarport Frenzy, Ron B Hanover and Nealy Lobell; the horses they trained in the US set 41 world records. In 1992, when their top clients decreased their involvement in trotting, the Nordins moved to Italy to become the private trainers for the Biasuzzi stable. In 1992-1993, the stable was believed the most profitable in the world.

References

External links

1917 births
2008 deaths
People from Hudiksvall Municipality
Swedish harness racers
American harness racers
Dan Patch Award winners
People from Hälsingland
Sportspeople from Gävleborg County